Pterotaea cariosa is a species of geometrid moth in the family Geometridae. It is found in North America.

The MONA or Hodges number for Pterotaea cariosa is 6568.

Subspecies
These three subspecies belong to the species Pterotaea cariosa:
 Pterotaea cariosa aporema Rindge, 1970
 Pterotaea cariosa cariosa
 Pterotaea cariosa incompta Rindge, 1970

References

Further reading

 

Boarmiini
Articles created by Qbugbot
Moths described in 1896